The 2018 Magyar Kupa Final was the final match of the 2017–18 Magyar Kupa, played between Puskás Akadémia and Újpest on 23 May 2018 at the Groupama Arena in Budapest, Hungary.

Route to the final

Match

References

External links
 Official site 

2018
Puskás Akadémia FC
Újpest FC matches
Association football penalty shoot-outs